The Capital Times was a free alternative weekly newspaper published in Wellington, New Zealand, from 1974 to 2013. It focused primarily on local events, the arts scene, and broader issues concerning the Wellington City region.  It included long-running cartoon Jitterati by Grant Buist.

The Capital Times closed in April 2013.

External links
Capital Times (New Zealand)
Closing of Capital Times

Defunct newspapers published in New Zealand
Mass media in Wellington
Publications established in 1974
1974 establishments in New Zealand
Publications disestablished in 2013
2013 disestablishments in New Zealand